Novoyaushevo (Yañı Yawış) is a rural locality (a village) and the administrative centre of Novoyaushevsky Selsoviet, Mechetlinsky District, Bashkortostan, Russia. The population was 550 as of 2010. There are 8 streets.

Geography 
Novoyaushevo is located 35 km south of Bolsheustyikinskoye (the district's administrative centre) by road. Staromeshcherovo is the nearest rural locality.

References 

Rural localities in Mechetlinsky District